Sangerville is a town in Piscataquis County, Maine, United States. The population was 1,306 at the 2020 census. The town was named after Colonel Calvin Sanger, a landowner.

On June 14, 2014 Sangerville celebrated its bicentennial.

Geography

Climate

This climatic region is typified by large seasonal temperature differences, with warm to hot (and often humid) summers and cold (sometimes severely cold) winters.  According to the Köppen Climate Classification system, Sangerville has a humid continental climate, abbreviated "Dfb" on climate maps.

Demographics

2010 census

As of the census of 2010, there were 1,343 people, 612 households, and 402 families living in the town. The racial makeup of the town was 96.8% White, 0.4% African American, 1.1% Native American, 0.2% Asian, 0.1% from other races, and 1.3% from two or more races. Hispanic or Latino of any race were 0.4% of the population.

There were 613 households, of which 23.3% had children under the age of 18 living with them, 52.4% were married couples living together, 7.2% had a female householder with no husband present, 6.0% had a male householder with no wife present, and 34.4% were non-families. 28.9% of all households were made up of individuals, and 14.1% had someone living alone who was 65 years of age or older. The average household size was 2.19 and the average family size was 2.61.

The median age in the town was 48.6 years. 18.2% of residents were under the age of 18; 6% were between the ages of 18 and 24; 19.8% were from 25 to 44; 35.7% were from 45 to 64; and 20.3% were 65 years of age or older. The gender makeup of the town was 48.3% male and 51.7% female.

2000 census

As of the census of 2000, there were 1,270 people, 554 households, and 361 families living in the town. There were 787 housing units at an average density of 20.4 per square mile (7.9/km). The racial makeup of the town was 98.35% White, 0.55% African American, 0.47% Native American, 0.16% Asian, and 0.47% from two or more races. Hispanic or Latino of any race were 0.39% of the population.

There were 554 households, out of which 26.4% had children under the age of 18 living with them, 53.1% were married couples living together, 8.5% had a female householder with no husband present, and 34.8% were non-families. 29.2% of all households were made up of individuals, and 14.3% had someone living alone who was 65 years of age or older.  The average household size was 2.29 and the average family size was 2.80.

In the town, the population was spread out, with 22.0% under the age of 18, 5.4% from 18 to 24, 26.6% from 25 to 44, 28.8% from 45 to 64, and 17.2% who were 65 years of age or older.  The median age was 42 years. For every 100 females, there were 101.3 males.  For every 100 females age 18 and over, there were 99.0 males.

The median income for a household in the town was $28,036, and the median income for a family was $35,809. Males had a median income of $26,518 versus $19,353 for females. The per capita income for the town was $13,984.  About 8.7% of families and 11.5% of the population were below the poverty line, including 12.5% of those under age 18 and 17.2% of those age 65 or over.

Notable people

 Hiram Maxim, inventor of the first self-powered machine gun
 Sir Harry Oakes, 1st Baronet

References

External links

 City-Data.com
	
	

Towns in Piscataquis County, Maine
Towns in Maine